Mucilaginibacter polytrichastri is a Gram-negative, non-spore-forming and rod-shaped bacterium from the genus of Mucilaginibacter which has been isolated from the moss Polytrichastrum formosum from the Gawalong glacier zone from the Tibetan Plateau in China.

References

External links 

Type strain of Mucilaginibacter polytrichastri at BacDive -  the Bacterial Diversity Metadatabase

Sphingobacteriia
Bacteria described in 2014